Penshurst railway station is located on the Illawarra line, serving the Sydney suburb of Penshurst. It is served by Sydney Trains T4 line services.

History
Penshurst station opened in 1886 being relocated south to its current location in 1905.

The station received an upgrade and 2 new lifts in January 2007.

Platforms and services

Transport Links
Punchbowl Bus Company operates four routes via Penshurst Station:

940: Hurstville to Bankstown via Riverwood
941: Hurstville to Bankstown via Greenacre
943: Hurstville to Lugarno
945: Hurstville to Bankstown via Mortdale

Penshurst station is served by one NightRide route:
N10: Sutherland to City Town Hall

References

External links

Penshurst station details Transport for New South Wales

Easy Access railway stations in Sydney
Railway stations in Sydney
Railway stations in Australia opened in 1886
Railway stations in Australia opened in 1905
Penshurst, New South Wales
Illawarra railway line